In the C++ Standard Library, algorithms are components that perform algorithmic operations on containers and other sequences.

The C++ standard provides some standard algorithms collected in the <algorithm> standard header. A handful of algorithms are also in the <numeric> header. All algorithms are in the  namespace.

Categories of algorithms
The algorithms in the C++ Standard Library can be organized into the following categories.
 Non-modifying sequence operations (e.g. ,)
 Modifying sequence operations (e.g. ,)
 Sorting (e.g. sort)
 Binary search (e.g.) 
 Heap (e.g.)
 Min/max (e.g.)

Examples
 
 
  returns the greater of the two arguments
  finds the maximum element of a range
  returns the smaller of the two arguments
  finds the minimum element of a range

References

External links
 C++ reference for standard algorithms

C++ Standard Library
Articles with example C++ code